Rollings is an English surname originating from the Norman given name Radulphus. Notable people with the surname include:

Andy Rollings (born 1954), English football centre back
Gordon Rollings (1926–1985), English actor
Matt Rollings (born 1964), American musician
Red Rollings (1904–1964), American reserve infielder
Wayne Rollings (1941-2022), Marine commanding general

See also
Philippe Hamilton-Rollings, Ukrainian football defender
Danny Rolling, American serial killer
Rowlings

References

English-language surnames